Sean Murphy is an American photographer.

Early life
Murphy born in Columbus, Ohio on Dec 13, 1968. He is originally from Fort Walton Beach, Florida and grew up in the Florida Panhandle. As a child he lived in Woodbridge, England; Phoenix, Arizona; and Fort Walton Beach, Florida where his father was stationed while active in the United States Air Force. He graduated from Choctawhatchee High School in 1987. In 1993 he graduated valedictorian from New England School of Photography in Boston.

Career
He has taken photographs of many prominent musicians and bands during the mid-1990s through early 2000s, like Weezer, Blink 182, Green Day, Kid Rock, Ryan Adams, The Deftones, Rage Against the Machine, Ice Cube, My Chemical Romance, and Dr. Dre, and Christina Aguilera. 

Over the years, he shot more advertising and is known for creating influential lifestyle campaigns. In addition to regular assignments for magazines such as Standup Paddle Magazine, his clients for print and advertising include Adidas, AT&T, Google, Jeep, McDonald's, Microsoft, Nike, Sprint and Toyota. In 2015, Murphy was invited by BOTE Boards and the SweetWater Brewing Company in their efforts to raise funds for the Waterkeeper Alliance.

The Travel Channel featured Sean twice as part of their Secrets of Action Photography episode with Aaron Goodwin and their 10 Ten Locals List while he traveled the Pacific Coast Highway with BOTE Boards. During the summer of 2017, as part of Los Angeles's Grand Park's fifth anniversary, Sean was selected as one of ten Los Angeles photographers for a photographic exhibition where 100 images of Angelenos were projected 150 ft high and 100 ft wide onto the south wall of the mid-century L.A. County Hall of Records. He has worked with publications such as Rolling Stone, Alternative Press, Bikini Magazine, Surface Magazine. Primary visual content creator for BOTE boards outdoor lifestyle brand

Personal life
Sean has 3 sons, Ozzy, Tripp and Milo. In 2019, Sean moved back to his hometown of Fort Walton Beach, Florida

Album credits

Awards 
Photo District News – Photo Annual contest – Advertising 2013
Photo District News – Photo Annual contest – Advertising 2014
International Photography Awards – Honorable Mention 2014

References

External links
 

Living people
American photographers
Album-cover and concert-poster artists
People from Fort Walton Beach, Florida
Year of birth missing (living people)